Hisashi Wakahara (born 21 April 1945) is a Japanese equestrian. He competed in two events at the 1988 Summer Olympics.

References

1945 births
Living people
Japanese male equestrians
Olympic equestrians of Japan
Equestrians at the 1988 Summer Olympics
Place of birth missing (living people)
Asian Games medalists in equestrian
Equestrians at the 1986 Asian Games
Asian Games gold medalists for Japan
Medalists at the 1986 Asian Games